Ernst Johan Kuipers (born 14 December 1959) is a Dutch gastroenterologist, professor and politician who has served as Minister of Health, Welfare and Sport in the fourth Rutte cabinet since 10 January 2022. He is a member of the Democrats 66 (D66) party.

Early life and education 
Kuipers was born in 1959 in Meppel, Drenthe and grew up in Creil, Flevoland. His father was a general practitioner and his mother a pharmacist. He attended secondary school in Emmeloord, where he completed the gymnasium curriculum in 1978. After obtaining a propaedeutic diploma (propedeuse) in chemistry, he studied medicine at the University of Groningen. Kuipers specialized in internal medicine and gastroenterology, and obtained a doctorate from the VU University Medical Center in 1995.

Career 
Between 1995 and 1997, Kuipers worked as a research associate at the Division of Infectious Diseases of the Vanderbilt University in Nashville, Tennessee. 

In 2000, Kuipers was appointed professor and head of gastroenterology and hepatology at the Erasmus University Medical Center. In this capacity, he led a widely reported 2007 study published in the journal Gut which showed that new cases of stomach cancer would likely fall 25 percent over the following 10 years in Western countries because of better living conditions.

In 2012, Kuipers became a member of the board of directors of the Erasmus University Medical Center. On 15 March 2013, he was appointed chief executive officer. In addition, he became the chairman of the National Acute Care Network (LNAZ) in 2015. In this position, he played a prominent role in the response to the COVID-19 pandemic in the Netherlands.

Minister of Health, 2022–present 
On 10 January 2022, Kuipers joined the fourth Rutte cabinet as Minister of Health, Welfare and Sport, on behalf of the Democrats 66.

References 

1959 births
Living people
20th-century Dutch physicians
21st-century Dutch physicians
21st-century Dutch politicians
Democrats 66 politicians
Dutch gastroenterologists
Dutch internists
Academic staff of Erasmus University Rotterdam
Ministers of Health of the Netherlands
People from Meppel
People from Noordoostpolder
University of Groningen alumni
Vanderbilt University faculty
Vrije Universiteit Amsterdam alumni